The Commandant of the Air Force Academy is the head and in-charge of all the functioning of the Air Force Academy in India. The Commandant of the Academy is a Three-star rank officer holding the rank of Air marshal. He is supported by the Deputy Commandant, a Two star appointment, the Chief Instructor (Flying) (Air Commodore rank officer) and the Chief Ground Instructor (Air Commodore rank officer). The current Commandant is Air Marshal B Chandra Sekhar.

History
The foundation stone of the Air Force Academy was laid by the then President of India Dr. Zakir Hussain on 11 October 1967. The academy was established in 1969 and started operations in 1971. The vision was to concentrate most of the ab-initio officer training of the Indian Air Force under one roof. Air Commodore J. D. Aquino, the commandant of the Air Force Flying College Jodhpur, was the first Commandant of the academy.

The appointment was held by an Air commodore till 1976, when it was upgraded to two-star rank. It was further upgraded to three-star rank in 2011.

List of Commandants

See also
 Commandant of the Indian Military Academy
 Commandant of Indian Naval Academy

Notes

References

Bibliography

Indian Air Force
Military academies of India
Indian military appointments
Indian Air Force appointments